Ichata Vahanamulu Niluparadu, also known by the initialism IVNR, is an Indian Telugu-language romantic drama thriller film produced by Ekta Shastri, Harish Koyalagundla and Aditya Shastri  and written and directed by S. Darshan. The film stars Sushanth, Meenakshi Chaudhary, Vennela Kishore, and Priyadarshi. The plot is inspired by real events and tells the story of the aftermath of a parking incident in a colony, which is blocked by a local gangster and his men.  The film was theatrically released on 27 August 2021.

Cast                                                                                                                                                                                                                                                              
 Sushanth as Arun
 Meenakshi Chaudhary as Meenakshi "Meenu" Yadav, Narasimha's sister
 Vennela Kishore as Sukku, Arun's friend and owner of the Royal Enfield showroom
 Priyadarshi as Puli, Arun's best-friend
 Venkat as Narasimha Yadav, Meenu's brother
 Abhinav Gomatam as Abhinav, Meenu's brother-in-law 
 Ravi Varma as Bhushan, Ex-contractor
 Aishwarya as Padma, Arun's mother
 Krishna Chaitanya as CI Rudra
 Samrat Shanmugavel as Puli's brother
 Varanasi Soumya as TV serial actress, Jhansi
 Harish Koyalagundla as Arun's friend 
 Sunil as Actor (cameo appearance)

Production
The film was launched on 30 January 2020 with the debut of S Darshan as director and Meenakshi Chaudhary entering an acting career. Meenakshi Choudhary represented  India and was crowned as Miss Grand India in 2018 and makes her film debut in this movie. Sushanth was cast as the male lead. In September 2020 shooting of the film resumed after a stoppage due to the COVID pandemic. The post-production work was completed in March 2021. The film's teaser released in January 2021, and The Times of India commented about the 90 second teaser that promo excites and makes this film a thrilling action ride. The first lyrical "Hey Manasendukuila" was released in February 2021. The pre theatrical release function was held on 25 August 2021 with the Trivikram Srinivas being the chief guest.

Release
Ichata Vahanamulu Niluparadu was theatrically released on 27 August 2021 in more than 300 theatres across India and over 100 theatres internationally including theatres in Singapore and the United States. Ichata Vahanamulu Niluparadu - No Parking was one of the first movies which had a theatrical release after the cinemas opened after the second wave of the COVID pandemic. Hindi rights for the film have been sold to Sony Entertainment. The movie was a commercial success with the producers making profit even before the theatrical release of the movie.

The film is available for streaming on aha, on-demand video streaming service from 17 September 2021.

Soundtrack 

The soundtrack is composed by Praveen Lakkaraju on lyrics of Sreejo, Arun Vemuri, Srinivasa Mouli, RollRida and Suresh Gangula.

Reception
Sravan Vanaparthy, writing for Times of India gave two stars out of five and felt that the first half was rather slow. He criticized the screenplay and editing as he wrote, "The screenplay and choppy editing are a let-down." He opined that the performance of actors and background music was just okay. Vanaparthy concluded the review by calling "The story of Ichata Vahanamulu Nilupa Radu has potential that’s left unexplored. This one’s a difficult one to sit through." Y Sunita Chowdhary of The Hindu criticized the film for its writing. She didn't like the characterization and wrote, "There are several characters in the film, many of them with dramatic entries, but their actions lack intensity or impact." Chowdhary wrote that Sunil and Vennela Kishore made her smile but for the lead cast, she said, "This isn’t the best we’ve seen from Sushanth and Meenakshi has a long way to go in terms of acting."

Sarah Justin reviewing for Sakshi Post rated the film with 2.5 stars out of 5 and wrote, "Sushanth has experimented with this film. However, the script lacks the punch required to elevate him as the hero. Can be watched for timepass." 123telugu.com gave a 2.75 and reviewed saying Sushanth is the life and soul of the film. When compared to his other films, he has vastly improved. He looks handsome and also does well in a performance oriented role. Sushanth was quite good in the second half. Yesteryear hero, Venkat is also good in his supporting role. Meenakshi Chowdary is quite impressive in her role and shares very good chemistry with Sushanth. Vennela Kishore is hilarious as the showroom manager.

References

External links 
 

2021 films
2020s Telugu-language films
2021 directorial debut films
2021 romantic drama films
2021 thriller films
Indian romantic drama films